Nikolay V. Dokholyan is an American biophysicist, academic and researcher. He is a G. Thomas Passananti Professor and Vice Chair for Research at Penn State College of Medicine.

Dokholyan’s research primarily focuses on translational research, with a particular attention on the applications of basic science in terms of addressing some of the challenging problems in biology and medicine. He is the author of a book entitled Computational Modeling of Biological Systems.

Dokholyan is a fellow of the American Association for the Advancement of Science, and American Physical Society, the founder of the CFold, Inc., and the founder and President of the Molecules in Action, LLC. He serves as Book Series Editor for Series in Computational Biophysics, Editor-in-Chief for Proteins: Structure, Function, and Bioinformatics, and an Editor for F1000 Research.

Education
Dokholyan studied at Moscow Institute of Physics and Technology and received his Bachelor’s and Master’s degree in Physics in 1992 and 1994, respectively. He then moved to the United States, earning his Doctoral degree in Physics from Boston University in 1999 with H. Eugene Stanley. He served as a National Institutes of Health Postdoctoral Fellow in the Department of Chemistry and Chemical Biology at Harvard University till 2002.

Career
Dokholyan started his career in 1988 with a two-year appointment as a Teacher of Physics and Mathematics in a school at Moscow Institute of Physics and Technology. From 2002 till 2008, he served as an Assistant Professor of Biochemistry and Biophysics at the University of North Carolina at Chapel Hill, and also held secondary appointments as faculty of Bioinformatics and Computational Biology Training Program, Molecular and Cellular Biophysics Program, and Carolina Center for Genome Sciences. He joined the faculty of Neuroscience Center in 2005, and Lineberger Comprehensive Cancer Center in 2006. In 2008 he was tenured and promoted to Associate Professor at the Department of Biochemistry and Biophysics, and in 2009, he joined the faculty at Cystic Fibrosis and Pulmonary Research & Treatment Center, and Center for Neurosensory Disorders. He served as a member of The North Carolina Translational and Clinical Sciences Institute from 2010 to 2018, as Professor in the Department of Biochemistry and Biophysics from 2011 to 2018, and as Michael Hooker Distinguished Professor from 2014 to 2018 at University of North Carolina at Chapel Hill. In 2017, he held appointment as Adjunct Professor in the Joint Department of Biomedical Engineering at University of North Carolina at Chapel Hill and North Carolina State University. Currently, he serves as Adjunct Professor at University of North Carolina at Chapel Hill, and holds adjunct appointments in the Departments of Chemistry Department and Biomedical Engineering at The Pennsylvania State University. He is also associated with The Huck Institutes of the Life Sciences. He serves as the G. Thomas Passananti Professor and Vice Chair for Research at the Penn State College of Medicine where he holds appointments in the Departments of Pharmacology and Biochemistry & Molecular Biology. In 2021, he became an Associate Director of the Penn State Clinical and Translational Science Institute.

Research
Dokholyan’s research falls in the areas of computational biology, translational science, biophysics, and biochemistry. His work is focused on developing and understanding basic principles of protein misfolding in neurodegenerative diseases using computational and experimental approaches. His lab has explored the approaches to molecular dynamics simulations and modeling, and drug discovery, while focusing on both biological therapeutics and small molecule screening.

Amyotrophic lateral sclerosis (ALS) etiology
In his study regarding ALS, Dokholyan determined the SOD1 aggregation pathway, and highlighted the occurrence of familial amyotrophic lateral sclerosis-linked SOD1 aggregation due to a mutation-induced increase in dimer dissociation and/or increase in apomonomer formation. He also discovered post-translational modifications of superoxide dismutase (SOD1) in human erythrocytes, and found that glutathionylation promotes SOD1 monomer formation and supports a model in which increased oxidative stress promotes SOD1 aggregation. In 2011, he studied the role of glutathionylation at Cys-111 in terms of inducing dissociation of wild type and FALS mutant SOD1 dimers using computational structural modeling. He further explored the model of ALS etiology, and found out that oxidative stress and aging are linked to protein aggregation.

Dokholyan described the toxicity of nonnative SOD1 trimer in terms of motor neurons, discovered the capability of SOD1 mutants in promoting trimerization increase cell death, and regarded the identification of cytotoxic species as a primary step in context of elucidating the molecular etiology of ALS. In 2018, he conducted a study based on the impacts of Large SOD1 aggregates on cell viability in a model of amyotrophic lateral sclerosis. Results of his study indicated that unlike trimeric SOD, large amyloid aggregates are protective to motor neurons.

Molecular regulators of cellular phenotypes
Dokholyan developed numerous tools for functional regulation of proteins in living cells. He also introduced concept of nanocomputing agents (NCAs), discussed its benefits in terms of promoting deeper understanding of human biology and disease, and facilitating the development of in situ precision therapeutics. In 2002, he regarded amino acids as nucleation centers for protein folding, and emphasized their "small-world" feature of having a limited set of vertices with large connectivity. Using the approach of Rapaport, he further developed discrete molecular dynamics studies of the folding of a protein-like model.

HIV vaccine
In 2019, Dokholyan developed epitopes that triggered immune response in rabbits capable of inactivation of live HIV virus. He explored basic structural elements for targets of protective antibodies, and demonstrated that design immunogens with high mimicry to viral proteins lead to the exploration of new templates for vaccine development.

Awards and honors
2003 - Recipient, IBM/UNC Research Council Award
2004 - IBM Junior Faculty Development Award, The University of North Carolina at Chapel Hill
2004 - March of Dimes Basil O’Connor Starter Scholar Research Award 
2011 - Book Series Editor, Series in Computational Biophysics
2013 - Fellow, American Physical Society
2014-2018 - Michael Hooker Distinguished Professorship 
2018 - G. Thomas Passananti Professorship
2019 - Distinguished Edmond J. Safra Center Speaker, Tel Aviv University 
2019 - Fellow, American Association for the Advancement of Science
2020 - Keynote Speaker, “Smart Materials Programmed to Operate in Living Systems”, Charlotte, USA
2021 - Dean Lecture, Penn State College of Medicine
2022 - Fellow, American Institute for Medical and Biological Engineering (AIMBE)

Bibliography

Books

Selected articles
Dokholyan, N. V., Buldyrev, S. V., Stanley, H. E., & Shakhnovich, E. I. (1998). Discrete molecular dynamics studies of the folding of a protein-like model. Folding and design, 3(6), 577-587.
Vendruscolo, M., Dokholyan, N. V., Paci, E., & Karplus, M. (2002). Small-world view of the amino acids that play a key role in protein folding. Physical Review E, 65(6), 061910.
Dokholyan, N. V., Li, L., Ding, F., & Shakhnovich, E. I. (2002). Topological determinants of protein folding. Proceedings of the National Academy of Sciences, 99(13), 8637-8641.
Yin, S., Ding, F., & Dokholyan, N. V. (2007). Eris: an automated estimator of protein stability. Nature methods, 4(6), 466-467.
Serohijos, A. W., Hegedűs, T., Aleksandrov, A. A., He, L., Cui, L., Dokholyan, N. V., & Riordan, J. R. (2008). Phenylalanine-508 mediates a cytoplasmic–membrane domain contact in the CFTR 3D structure crucial to assembly and channel function. Proceedings of the National Academy of Sciences, 105(9), 3256-3261.

References 

Moscow Institute of Physics and Technology alumni
Boston University alumni
Russian American
Biophysicists
Living people
Year of birth missing (living people)
Fellows of the American Physical Society